The Virgilian series is the youngest part of the Pennsylvanian epoch in the North American geologic classification series. During Virgilian times, the top of the Conemaugh and the entire Monongahela group were deposited.  As with other Carboniferous series, it comprises cyclothems, or distinct cycles of sedimentary rock formation.

Monongahela cyclothems (youngest at top)
Note: the names below are of the Conemaugh age, not Monongahela age
Upper Little Pittsburgh
Lower Little Pittsburgh
Little Clarksburgh
Elk Lick
Duquesne
Gaysport
Ames
Harlem
Upper Bakerstown
Anderson
Wilgus
Upper Brush Creek
Lower Brush Creek
Mason
Mahoning

References

Carboniferous geology of Pennsylvania
Carboniferous System of North America